Martin Engeset (born 20 July 1964 in Oslo) is a Norwegian politician for the Conservative Party.

He was elected to the Norwegian Parliament from Østfold in 2001, and has been re-elected on one occasion. He had previously served in the position of deputy representative during the terms 1985–1989 and 1993–1997.

From 1983 to 2001 he was a member of Østfold county council. He chaired the county party chapter from 1990 to 2000, and was a member of the Conservative Party central board in the same period.

He has education from the BI School of Management.

References

1964 births
Living people
Conservative Party (Norway) politicians
Members of the Storting
Østfold politicians
People from Sarpsborg
BI Norwegian Business School alumni
21st-century Norwegian politicians